Vibuthipura Lake is a lake in the suburb of Hindustan Aeronautics Limited, in the southeast of the city of Bengaluru. The lake is the part of Bellandur-Varthur Lake series.

History
A lake in Vibhutipura was built by the Hoysalas (10-14th century). An inscription from the 14th century describes the creation of a village and tank in the area.

The lake was maintained by the state forest department. Administration was handed over to Bangalore Development Authority (BDA) and then Bruhat Bengaluru Mahanagara Palike (BBMP). 

Local populations became involved with the lake following sewage inflow, dumping and encroachment. This resulted in a populist approach to governance of the lake. Residential associations and Vibhutipura Kere Abhivridhi Mattu Samrakshane Samiti (VIKAS) have campaigned for lake restoration. Restoration activities have included construction of a walking path and construction of a fence. Recreational use has increased. The lake is seasonal. In 2019, when dry, the lake bed is used for unofficial activities such as cricket and grazing.

References

Further reading
 
 
 

Lakes of Bangalore